Kerby is both a surname and a given name. Notable people with the name include:

Surname:
Kerby (Ipswich martyr) (died 1546)
Edwin Kerby (1885–1971), Australian politician
Harold Spencer Kerby (1893-1963), Royal Air Force Air Vice-Marshal who commanded British air forces in East Africa during the Second World War
Henry Kerby (1914–1971), British Conservative Member of Parliament
Trey Kerby (born 1984), American sports blogger
William F. Kerby (1908–1989), chairman and CEO of Dow Jones & Co. and publisher of The Wall Street Journal
William J. Kerby, (1870-1936) writer, sociologist and Catholic social worker

Given name:
Kerby Farrell (1913–1975), minor league baseball manager
Kerby Joseph (born 2000), American football player
Kerby A. Miller, American historian
Kerby Raymundo (born 1981), Filipino basketball player

Fictional characters:
George and Marion Kerby, lead characters in the 1937 film Topper

See also
Bernadine Oliver-Kerby (born 1971), broadcaster

Kerby Farrell, (1913–1975), minor league baseball manager